Gerald McCarthy may refer to:

 Gerald McCarthy (footballer) (born 1951), former Australian rules footballer
 Gerald McCarthy (hurler) (born 1945), retired Irish hurling manager and former player
 Gerald McCarthy (poet) (born 1947), American poet, best known for work on the Vietnam War
 Gerry McCarthy, Australian politician